Ross Kriel is the President of the Jewish Council of the Emirates, and a key figure of the Jewish Community of the United Arab Emirates.

Early life 
Kriel was born in Johannesburg, South Africa.

United Arab Emirates 
He arrived to Dubai in 2013, 2 weeks before Rosh Hashanah. He and his wife became the first family in the city to keep kosher.

Kriel reacted positively to the signing of the Abraham Accords, saying:“Only a week ago, the things happening today were still a dream, like seeing the Israelis  and Emirati flags flying side by side on the front pages of local newspapers.

“It’s going to be a warm peace.”

Personal life 
His wife, Elli (who is of Greek descent), is the head of Elli's Kosher Kitchen, which was made to accommodate for the Dietary Needs of Jewish tourists in the Emirates.

The Kriels live in a villa at the outskirts of Dubai, which is also home to a Synagogue as well as a centre of Jewish life in the UAE.

See also 
 Solly Wolf
 Naum Koen

References 

Emirati Jews
Living people
Year of birth missing (living people)
People from Johannesburg
South African Jews